There are a number of terms that are used in connection with caves, caving and speleology. The following is an incomplete list.

A

An enclosed air space in a flooded tube between the water and the roof

B

C

K

P

R

S

T

W

See also
 Glossary of climbing terms

References

External Links 

 A Lexicon of Cave and Karst Terminology with Special Reference to Environmental Karst Hydrology (PDF) -- A free, comprehensive dictionary of caving and speleological terms.

Speleology
Caving
Caving
Wikipedia glossaries using description lists